The Konstantinos Karamanlis Institute for Democracy is the official think-tank of the Greek conservative Nea Demokratia (Greece)(ND) party, and named after the party's founder, Konstantinos Karamanlis. It was founded in Athens in January 1998 with the aim of promoting the principles of liberal democracy and the open market in the context of a modern welfare state. It is structured in five departments (International Cooperation, Publications, Events, Research and Political Academy). It is a member of the Wilfried Martens Centre (think tank), the official foundation/think tank of the European People's Party.

Current structure 
Source:

Chairman
Rodi Kratsa-Tsagaropoulou

Director General
Konstantina E. Botsiou

Secretary
Zetta Makri

Treasurer
Demosthenis Anagnostopoulos

Board Members
Alivizatos Petros
Ioannidis Georgios
Karloutsos Michael
Balerbas Athanasios
Nakou Vasiliki
Papagelopoulos Demitrios
Papanastasiou (Mata) Stamatia
Papastavrou Alexios
Stefanakis Georgios
Sofronis Georgios

References

External links 
 Official webpage

Think tanks based in Greece
New Democracy (Greece)
Political and economic think tanks based in the European Union
1998 establishments in Greece
Think tanks established in 1998
Konstantinos Karamanlis